Sea from Shore is the debut album by David Brewis' solo project, School of Language. The group was created by Brewis during Field Music's 2007 to 2009 hiatus, during which the two Brewis brothers Peter and David Brewis went off to pursue wider musical interests not under the Field Music umbrella. "Poor Boy" and "Rockist" were released as singles, the latter with a video. The version of "Rockist" released as a single is an edited version containing elements of both Parts 1 and 4, representing half of the overall work, the two halves of which bookend the album. "Rockist" was the album's biggest commercial success, with Part 1 being used in television adverts for the Ford Fiesta.

Track listing
All songs written and composed by David Brewis.
"Rockist Part 1" – 2:16 
"Rockist Part 2" – 3:14
"Disappointment '99" – 4:03
"Poor Boy" – 4:20
"Keep Your Water" – 5:22
"Marine Life" – 2:43
"Ships" – 2:47
"This Is No Fun" – 3:47
"Extended Holiday" – 3:20
"Rockist Part 3 (Aposiopesis)" – 2:12
"Rockist Part 4" – 5:32

Personnel
David Brewis (Field Music)
Barry Hyde (The Futureheads) – guitar and backing vocals on "Disappointment '99"
David Craig – backing vocals on "Disappointment '99" and "Extended Holiday"
Marie Nixon (formerly Marie Du Santiago of Kenickie/Rosita) – backing vocals on "Disappointment '99" and "Extended Holiday"
Sarah McKeown (also formerly of Rosita) – backing vocals on "Disappointment '99" and "Extended Holiday"

References

2008 debut albums
Field Music albums
Memphis Industries albums